Vaughan Public Libraries (VPL) is a public library system consisting of twelve libraries in the city of Vaughan in Ontario, Canada. It has a collection of more than 534,000 items and serves over 1.7 million visitors a year. VPL has twelve branch locations, including three resource libraries. The Bathurst Clark Resource Library opened in 1994. Pierre Berton Resource Library opened in 2004. The newest resource library, Civic Centre Resource Library, opened in May 2016, and houses VPL’s administration offices. The latest branch, VMC Library (located in Vaughan Metropolitan Centre), opened to the public in June 2022. VPL serves the growing multicultural community of Vaughan by offering collections in Chinese, Gujarati, Hebrew, Hindi, Italian, Korean, Malayalam, Portuguese, Persian, Punjabi, Russian, Spanish, Tamil, Urdu, and Vietnamese, in addition to French and English.

The current Chief Executive Officer of Vaughan Public Libraries is Margie Singleton.

Branches 

The branches of Vaughan Public Library are:

A  library will open at the Cortellucci Vaughan Hospital in late 2021.

The Maple Library and the community centre in which it is located underwent renovations in June 2021 and reopened in April 2022. Upgrades and additions include accessibility features, free Wi-Fi, and an outdoor reading garden.

Membership 
Free library memberships are available for those who live, work, attend school full-time or own property in the city of Vaughan. VPL also offer free membership to members of Aurora Public Library, Brampton Library, Caledon Public Library, King Township Public Library, Newmarket Public Library, Richmond Hill Public Library, and Markham Public Library. All other people may acquire a membership by paying an annual fee of $80.00.

Services 
Members of Vaughan Public Libraries have access to a diverse collection of resources including books, media, electronic databases, and other library services.
Information and reference services
Access to full text databases
Community information
Internet access
Reader's advisory services
Programs for children, youth and adults
 Delivery to homebound individuals
 Interlibrary loan
 Free downloadable audiobooks
 WiFi Access
 Public Microsoft Office workstations
 Email Librarian
 AskON live chat research help services
 Business resources
 Community information
 Job/Career resources
 Access to full-text databases
 Computer training suite and boardroom
 Meeting room rentals
 Exam proctoring
 Study rooms
 Volunteer opportunities
 Photocopiers/Printers available
 Adult Basic Literacy
 English as a Second Language
 Overdrive Digital Collection
 Multilingual Collections

Borrowing privileges 
Holdings are loaned to a patron for a period of time dependent on the type of item borrowed:

Special collections
Special collections at VPL include:

Adult Basic Literacy – This is a collection for adult learners.  It includes books, kits of books and audio, Internet links, and databases.  Adult Basic Literacy collections are available at all locations.

Black Heritage - Vaughan Public Libraries' Black Heritage Collection was begun on February 25, 1989.  It was the first of its kind in York Region, and is housed at Dufferin Clark Library.

Cinema Collection - This collection is housed at Pierre Berton Resource Library and Bathurst Clark Resource Library.  It features the work of important directors from around the world and films not made by the major studios or with big Hollywood budgets.  Award-winning films from world cinema festivals can be found in this collection.

English as a Second Language – This collection includes books, DVDs, and kits of books and audio or CD-ROM to meet the needs English Language learners.  Of particular note are book chat sets of short novels at various learning levels, and TOEFL, IELTS, and other test preparation materials.

Government Documents – Housed at the Bathurst Clark Resource Library, the Government Documents collection offers access to Federal and Provincial Government documents, including statistics, policy and research papers, and other historical records.

Local Studies – This collection is especially useful for genealogists, those wishing to construct family trees, and local researchers needing access to current and historical municipal documents.  The Local Studies Collection assists contains information concerning the history of Vaughan as a township, a town and finally a city. This collection now features VPL’s first digital local history project “Villages to City: An Oral History of Vaughan”.

Professional Collection – The professional collection offers access to resources for public and school library professionals.  Topics covered range from program planning, to collection development, to library management.  The professional collection is housed at the Bathurst Clark Resource Library.

References

External links

 Vaughan Public Libraries
 Online catalogue
 Ontario Public Libraries

Vaughan
Public libraries in Ontario
Buildings and structures in the Regional Municipality of York
Education in the Regional Municipality of York